Lincoln Township is a township in Anderson County, Kansas, United States. As of the 2018 census, it has a population of 85 within its 49.2 square miles. The media age is 60.5 and the township is 58% male. There are approximately 36 households and 2.4 people per household.

History
Lincoln Township was organized in 1870.

Geography
Neighboring townships include Centerville, Lone Elm, Monroe, North Rich, Walker, and Washington.

References
 USGS Geographic Names Information System (GNIS)

External links
 City-Data.com

Townships in Anderson County, Kansas
Townships in Kansas